This page presents a list of the longest railway tunnels of the world, excluding subway tunnel sections.

World's longest railway tunnels in use

World's longest railway tunnels under construction

See also

 List of long railway tunnels in China
 List of longest subway tunnel sections
 List of long tunnels by type
 List of longest tunnels

Notes

References

Tunnels, railway
Tunnels, railway